N'écoutez pas, mesdames ! (Don't Listen, Ladies!) is a three-act comedy by Sacha Guitry, premiered at the Théâtre de la Madeleine on 23 May 1942.

Original cast 
 Sacha Guitry : Daniel Bacheley 
 Hélène Perdrière : Madeleine Bacheley 
 Jeanne Fusier-Gir : Julie Bille-en-bois 
 Léon Walther : le baron de Charançay

Revivals
The play was given as Don't Listen, Ladies at the St James's Theatre, London, in September 1948 with a cast including Constance Cummings, Denholm Elliott and Betty Marsden, and at the Booth Theatre, Broadway, in December 1948 with a cast headed by Jack Buchanan.

Notes

External links 
 "N'écoutez pas, mesdames !", Les Archives du spectacle

1942 plays
Plays by Sacha Guitry